Mississippi County Courthouse may refer to:
Mississippi County Courthouse (Blytheville, Arkansas)
Mississippi County Courthouse (Osceola, Arkansas)
Mississippi County Courthouse in Charleston, Missouri